Viktor Aleksandrovich Nemkov (born January 26, 1987) is a Russian sambist, judoka competitor and mixed martial artist. Nemkov won the 2011 World Sambo Championships in Combat Sambo. He is the older brother of Vadim Nemkov.

Mixed martial arts career

Background
Viktor Nemkov was born in a small village in Zhalgyskan, Kazakh SSR, Soviet Union, now modern-Kazakhstan. In 1999 the family moved to the village Tomarovka, Belgorod Oblast. There, Nemkov began to train in Judo.

Having spent some successful tournaments, Nemkov became a "Master of Sport in Judo."

Nemkov was the 2008 Russian Combat Sambo bronze medalist in the 90 kg weight category and the 2009 World Cup champion.

Nemkov trains at the Red Devil Sport Club; a training facility and team strongly linked with the M-1 Global promotion and Fedor Emelianenko.

M-1 Global

Nemkov began his professional mixed martial arts career with a loss to Magomed Sultanakhmedov via TKO, but quickly rebounded against newcomer Christian Bombay. Nemkov was able to secure a triangle choke on Bombay early in the first round to claim his first victory.

Nemkov continued in M-1 with several victories, including one in a fight against Sergey Khramov.

Nemkov's toughest challenge at that point came against the vastly experienced Tony Lopez in South Korea. Lopez' experience was perhaps too great, as he walked away with a submission victory via rear naked choke in the second round, handing Nemkov his second career loss.

Nemkov then signed to fight Khanilav Khanilaev at the M-1 2009 Finals. Nemkov went onto suffer his third career defeat, losing via split decision. Nemkov would bounce back with a victory over Shamil Vajsurov who, going into the fight, had a record of 0-1.

In August 2010, Nemkov was reportedly scouted by World Wrestling Entertainment - whilst on a tour of Russia - who wanted to sign him as a professional wrestler.

In April 2011, Nemkov fought Vinny Magalhaes for the vacant M-1 Global Light Heavyweight title. Early on, Magalhaes looked for a takedown, but it was Nemkov who was able to secure top position early on. From there, Nemkov had to defend against multiple submission attempts, including an omoplata which seemed to be almost locked in. From the second round, Magalhaes visibly tired, but still managed to mount Nemkov on a couple of occasions. Magalhaes was able to finish Nemkov in the third round via rare mounted gogoplata with a neck crank.

Following the loss, Nemkov went on a four fight winning streak, including a tournament win held over a 4-month span.

Professional Fighters League
Nemkov participated in the 2019 season of PFL. During the regular season, Nemkov defeated Rakim Cleveland and Rashid Yusupov via decisions and advanced to playoffs. In the playoffs he faced Bozigit Ataev at PFL 9, which ended in a majority draw leading to Ataev advancing to the semifinals.

Bellator MMA
On September 1, 2020, it was announced that Nemkov had signed a contract with Bellator MMA.

Nemkov made his Bellator debut at Bellator 257 on April 16, 2021 against Karl Albrektsson. He lost the bout via unanimous decision.

Nemkov faced Leonardo Guimarães on December 19, 2021 at Open Fighting Championship 15. He won via unanimous decision.

Nemkov was scheduled to face Jose “Gugu” Augusto on July 22, 2022 at Bellator 283. However, due to a injury to Nemkov, the bout was scrapped.

Championships and accomplishments
M-1 Global
M-1 Light Heavyweight Championship (2 Times)

Sambo
All-Russian Sambo Federation
Russian Combat Sambo National Championships 8nd Place (2010)

Mixed martial arts record

|-
|Win
|align=center|32–8–1
|Stepan Gorshechnikov
|Submission (rear-naked choke)
|ASI Championship 6
|
|align=center|1
|align=center|2:31
|Kemerovo, Russia
|
|-
|Win
|align=center|31–8–1
|Leonardo Guimarães
|Decision (unanimous)
|Open Fighting Championship 15
|
|align=center|3
|align=center|5:00
|Moscow, Russia
|
|-
|Loss
|align=center|30–8–1
|Karl Albrektsson
|Decision (unanimous)
|Bellator 257
|
|align=center|3
|align=center|5:00
|Uncasville, Connecticut, United States 
|
|-
|Draw
|align=center|
|Bozigit Ataev
|Draw (majority)
|PFL 9
|
|align=center| 2
|align=center| 5:00
|Las Vegas, Nevada, United States
|
|-
|Win
|align=center|30–7
|Rashid Yusupov
|Decision (split)
|PFL 6
|
|align=center| 3
|align=center| 5:00
|Atlantic City, New Jersey, United States
|
|-
|Win
|align=center|29–7
|Rakim Cleveland
|Decision (unanimous)
|PFL 3
|
|align=center| 3
|align=center| 5:00
|Uniondale, New York, United States
|
|-
|Win
|align=center|28–7
|Sergio Souza
|Submission (choke)
|Club Alexander - The Don Battle
|
|align=center| 1
|align=center| 2:02
|Voronezh, Russia
|
|-
| Loss
| align=center| 27–7
| Klidson Abreu
| Submission (rear-naked choke)
| Russian Cagefighting Championship 3
| 
| align=center| 2
| align=center| 1:02
| Yekaterinburg, Russia
|
|-
| Win
| align=center| 27–6
| Ronny Markes
| Submission (guillotine choke)
| M-1 Challenge 77 - Nemkov vs. Markes
| 
| align=center| 1
| align=center| 2:06
| Sochi, Russia
|
|-
| Win
| align=center| 26–6
| Attila Végh
| Decision (unanimous)
| M-1 Challenge 71: Nemkov vs. Vegh
| 
| align=center| 3
| align=center| 5:00
| St. Petersburg, Russia
|
|-
| Loss
| align=center| 25–6
| Rashid Yusupov
| Decision (split)
| M-1 Challenge 66: Nemkov vs. Yusupov
| 
| align=center| 5
| align=center| 5:00
| Orenburg, Russia
|  Lost M-1 Global Light Heavyweight Championship
|-
| Win
| align=center| 25–5
| Stephan Puetz
| Decision (majority)
| M-1 Challenge 63: Puetz vs. Nemkov 2
| 
| align=center| 5
| align=center| 5:00
| St. Petersburg, Russia
|  Won M-1 Global Light Heavyweight Championship
|-
| Win
| align=center| 24–5
| Maro Perak
| Decision (unanimous)
| M-1 Challenge 60: Battle in Orel
| 
| align=center| 3
| align=center| 5:00
| Oryol, Russia
| 
|-
| Win
| align=center| 23–5
| Florian Martin
| Submission (rear naked choke)
| M-1 Global: Steel Battle 2
| 
| align=center| 1
| align=center| 1:42
| Stary Oskol, Russia
| 
|-
| Win
| align=center| 22–5
| Beksot Jiyanov
| TKO (punches)
| M-1 Global: Steel Battle
| 
| align=center| 1
| align=center| 3:03
| Stary Oskol, Russia
| 
|-
| Loss
| align=center| 21–5
| Stephan Puetz
| Decision (split)
| M-1 Challenge 46
| 
| align=center| 5
| align=center| 5:00
| St. Petersburg, Russia
|  Lost M-1 Global Light Heavyweight Championship
|-
| Win
| align=center| 21–4
| Vasiliy Babich
| Submission (armbar)
| M-1 Challenge 43
| 
| align=center| 2
| align=center| 4:06
| Surgut, Russia
|  Won M-1 Global Light Heavyweight Championship
|-
| Win
| align=center| 20–4
| Maciej Browarski
| Decision (unanimous)
| ANMMA - Liberation
| 
| align=center| 3
| align=center| 5:00
| Belgorod, Russia
| 
|-
| Win
| align=center| 19–4
| Reinaldo da Silva
| Submission (leg lock)
| M-1 Global - M-1 Challenge 40
| 
| align=center| 2
| align=center| N/A
| Ingushetia, Russia
| 
|-
| Win
| align=center| 18–4
| Gadzhimurad Antigulov
| Submission (guillotine choke)
| M-1 Challenge 36 - Confrontation in Mytishchi
| 
| align=center| 2
| align=center| 1:30
| Mytishchi, Moscow Oblast, Russia
| 
|-
| Win
| align=center| 17–4
| Baga Agaev
| Submission (guillotine choke)
| League S-70 - Russian Championship Finals
| 
| align=center| 1
| align=center| 1:12
| Moscow, Russia
| 
|-
| Win
| align=center| 16–4
| Khadzhimurat Kamilov
| Submission (armbar)
| League S-70 - Russian Championship Semifinals
| 
| align=center| 2
| align=center| 4:10
| Moscow, Russia
| 
|-
| Win
| align=center| 15–4
| Abdul-Kerim Edilov
| Decision (unanimous)
| League S-70 - Russian Championship Third Round
| 
| align=center| 3
| align=center| 5:00
| Moscow, Russia
| 
|-
| Win
| align=center| 14–4
| Chuck Grigsby
| KO (punch)
| Sambo-70 - Russia vs. Brazil
| 
| align=center| 2
| align=center| 3:24
| Sochi, Russia
| 
|-
| Loss
| align=center| 13–4
| Vinny Magalhães
| Submission (mounted gogoplata neck crank)
| M-1 Challenge 25: Zavurov vs. Enomoto
| 
| align=center| 3
| align=center| 1:40
| Saint Petersburg, Russia
|  For vacant M-1 Global Light Heavyweight Championship
|-
| Win
| align=center| 13–3
| Vitaly Smirnov
| Decision (unanimous)
| Mix Fight Tournament
| 
| align=center| 2
| align=center| 5:00
| Voronezh, Russia
| 
|-
| Win
| align=center| 12–3
| Daniel Viscaya
| Submission (triangle choke)
| M-1 Challenge 22: Narkun vs. Vasilevsky
| 
| align=center| 1
| align=center| 1:09
| Moscow, Russia
| 
|-
| Win
| align=center| 11–3
| Vasily Klepikov
| Submission (arm-triangle choke)
| M-1 Mix Fighter: Season 1- Stage 2
| 
| align=center| 2
| align=center| N/A
| St.Petersburg, Russia
| 
|-
| Win
| align=center| 10–3
| Artur Korchemny
| Submission (arm-triangle choke)
| M-1 Mix Fighter: Season 1- Stage 1
| 
| align=center| 1
| align=center| 2:55
| St.Petersburg, Russia
| 
|-
| Win
| align=center| 9–3
| Rashid Magomedov
| KO (punches)
| LM - Tournament 2
| 
| align=center| 2
| align=center| 3:24
| Lipetsk Oblast, Russia
| 
|-
| Win
| align=center| 8–3
| Shamil Vajsurov
| Decision (unanimous)
| M-1 Selection 2010: Eastern Europe Round 2
| 
| align=center| 2
| align=center| 5:00
| Kyiv, Ukraine
| 
|-
| Loss
| align=center| 7–3
| Khanilav Khanilaev
| Decision (split)
| M-1 Challenge: 2009 Selections 9
| 
| align=center| 3
| align=center| 5:00
| St. Petersburg, Russia
| 
|-
| Win
| align=center| 7–2
| Ramazan Ramazanov
| Submission (triangle choke)
| M-1 Challenge: 2009 Selections 8
| 
| align=center| 1
| align=center| 3:08
| Kyiv, Ukraine
| 
|-
| Win
| align=center| 6–2
| Rasul Magomedaliev
| Submission (triangle choke)
| M-1 Challenge: 2009 Selections 6
| 
| align=center| 1
| align=center| 2:52
| Dagestan, Russia
| 
|-
| Loss
| align=center| 5–2
| Tony Lopez
| Submission (rear naked choke)
| M-1 Challenge 17: Korea
| 
| align=center| 2
| align=center| 3:06
| Seoul, South Korea
| 
|-
| Win
| align=center| 5–1
| Ilya Malyukov
| Decision (unanimous)
| M-1 Challenge: 2009 Selections 3
| 
| align=center| 2
| align=center| 5:00
| Saint Petersburg, Russia
| 
|-
| Win
| align=center| 4–1
| Ishkhan Zakharian
| TKO (corner stoppage)
| M-1 Challenge: 2009 Selections 1
| 
| align=center| 2
| align=center| 0:34
| Saint Petersburg, Russia
| 
|-
| Win
| align=center| 3–1
| Magomed Umarov
| Decision (unanimous)
| Pro FC-Grand Prix
| 
| align=center| 3
| align=center| 5:00
| Moscow, Russia
| 
|-
| Win
| align=center| 2–1
| Sergey Khramov
| Decision (unanimous)
| M-1 MFC: Fedor Emelianenko Cup
| 
| align=center| 3
| align=center| 5:00
| Saint Petersburg, Russia
| 
|-
| Win
| align=center| 1–1
| Christian Bombay
| Technical Submission (triangle choke)
| M-1 Challenge 2: Russia
| 
| align=center| 1
| align=center| 1:31
| Saint Petersburg, Russia
| 
|-
| Loss
| align=center| 0–1
| Magomed Sultanakhmedov
| TKO (punches)
| Profi Mix Fight Championship
| 
| align=center| 1
| align=center| N/A
| Novgorod Oblast, Russia
|

References

External links

Living people
Russian male mixed martial artists
Light heavyweight mixed martial artists
Russian practitioners of Brazilian jiu-jitsu
Russian male judoka
Russian sambo practitioners
Mixed martial artists utilizing sambo
Mixed martial artists utilizing judo
Mixed martial artists utilizing Brazilian jiu-jitsu
1987 births